Hilton is a ghost town in Yazoo County, Mississippi, United States.

Hilton had a post office.  The population was 27 in 1900, and had grown to about 40 by 1906.

References

Former populated places in Yazoo County, Mississippi
Former populated places in Mississippi